Elfin Clubman may refer to one of three automobiles:

 Elfin Clubman, produced by Elfin Sports Cars from 1961 to 1965
 Elfin MS8 Clubman, produced by Elfin Sports Cars from 2006
 Elfin Type 3 Clubman, 1998 to 2007